Sabin Howard is a classical figurative sculptor based in New York City, with a studio in the Bronx. He is a board member of the National Sculpture Society. His work has been shown at numerous solo and group shows. He is the sculptor for a project entitled "The Weight of Sacrifice" that is one of five finalists for the World War I Memorial in Pershing Park, Washington D.C. His notable works include the recent National WWI Memorial sculpture. 
Howard is the creator of the large-scale pieces Hermes, Aphrodite, and Apollo, as well as many smaller pieces. His works are owned by private collectors and museums including The Mount, Edith Wharton's home.

Art critic James Cooper wrote in 2012: "Howard’s sculptures have content as well as exquisite form".

Howard co-wrote a book called The Art Of Life with his novelist wife Traci L. Slatton. As part of a team put together by a young architect, Joseph Weishaar, Sabin was selected to create the sculpture at the National World War I Memorial in Washington D.C.

He is currently sculpting the National WWI Memorial, a 60 foot long bronze relief to be installed in Pershing Park, Washington DC

References

20th-century American sculptors
Living people
Artists from the Bronx
21st-century American sculptors
American male sculptors
1963 births
Sculptors from New York (state)
20th-century American male artists